Hajime no Ippo is a 2000 Japanese anime series based on the manga written by George Morikawa. The first 75-episode anime television series, produced by Madhouse, Nippon Television and VAP and directed by Satoshi Nishimura, aired on Nippon TV between October 4, 2000, and March 27, 2002. The episodes were collected into twenty-five DVDs released by VAP from March 16, 2001 to March 21, 2003. The last DVD includes a special episode which did not air in Japan, numbered 76. A television film titled : Champion Road aired on April 18, 2003. An original video animation (OVA) titled  Mashiba vs. Kimura was released on September 5, 2003.

A second series titled : New Challenger aired on Nippon TV from January 6 to June 30, 2009.

In 2009, Rikiya Koyama, the voice actor of Mamoru Takamura, revealed in his blog that a sequel to the : New Challenger television series was being planned. At the end of his blog entry, he wrote, "Of course, a sequel is also being planned!!". In July 2013, it was reported in that year's 34th issue of Kodansha's Weekly Shōnen Magazine that a third season of  would air in the fall 2013 season. The third season, titled : Rising, ran for 25 episodes from October 5, 2013 to March 29, 2014. : Rising was streamed on Crunchyroll.

In North America, the first series was licensed by Geneon Entertainment in 2003, which released it under the name Fighting Spirit. Geneon distributed Fighting Spirit on 15 DVDs with five episodes per disc. The first DVD was released on July 6, 2004 and the fifteenth released on December 19, 2006. The DVDs included English and Spanish language tracks, as well as the original Japanese. The TV film Champion Road was released on North America on January 9, 2007. There were no plans to release the OVA, Mashiba vs. Kimura. Disc sales of the series did not perform well. In September 2020, Discotek Media announced that they have licensed the series for a 2021 release, including the 76 episodes, Champion Road and, for the first time in North America, the OVA Mashiba vs. Kimura.

Series overview

Episode list

Season 1: The Fighting! (2000−02)

Season 2: New Challenger (2009)

Season 3: Rising (2013−14)

References

Episodes
Hajime no Ippo